John Cyril Emerson Swaby  (11 December 1905 – 21 April 1974) was an Anglican Bishop of Jamaica in the 20th century.

He was born on 11 December 1905 and educated at Munro College, Jamaica and Durham University and ordained in 1929. His first post was as a curate at Brown's Town after which he held incumbencies at St Cyprian's Highgate and then St Matthew's Kingston. From 1951 he was Archdeacon of South Middlesex and a decade later was promoted to be suffragan of Bishop of Kingston. After seven years he was promoted to be the diocesan bishop, the Bishop of Jamaica, and served until his death on 21 April 1974.

References

1907 births
People educated at Munro College
20th-century Anglican bishops in the Caribbean
Archdeacons in Jamaica
Anglican bishops of Jamaica
Commanders of the Order of the British Empire
1974 deaths
Alumni of St John's College, Durham